The 2005–06 Danish Superliga season was the 16th season of the Danish Superliga league championship, governed by the Danish Football Association. It took place from the first match on July 19, 2005 to the final match on May 14, 2006.

FC København will, as Danish champions, qualify for UEFA Champions League 2006-07 qualification and the Royal League 2006-07. Brøndby IF will, as runners-up, qualify for UEFA Cup 2006-07 qualification and Royal League. Odense BK will, as 3rd placed, qualify for the UEFA Intertoto Cup 2006 and Royal League, while Viborg FF, as the 4th placed team, just qualify for Royal League. SønderjyskE and AGF relegated to the 1st Division. The 1st Division champions and runners-up will promote to the Superliga.

Participants

Table

Results

Top goalscorers

See also
 2005-06 in Danish football

External links
  Netsuperligaen.dk (unofficial site)
  Onside.dk (Viasat sport page)
 The FA's table

Danish Superliga seasons
1
Denmark